Lester Nelson "Les" Carney (born March 31, 1934) is a retired American sprinter who won a silver medal in the 200 m at the 1960 Olympics, ahead of two teammembers who beat him at the Olympic trials. He won another silver in this event at the 1959 Pan American Games.

Besides athletics Carney also played American football at Ohio University. He was drafted by the Baltimore Colts in 1958 but never played professionally. After retiring from sport he worked as a buyer for a sporting goods company in Akron, Ohio.

On October 2, 2015, Indian Creek High School (formally known as Wintersville High School) named its brand new track and field after the Olympic Silver Medalist.  The field is now the Lester Carney Track at Kettlewell Stadium.

References

1934 births
Living people
American male sprinters
Athletes (track and field) at the 1959 Pan American Games
Athletes (track and field) at the 1960 Summer Olympics
Olympic silver medalists for the United States in track and field
Medalists at the 1960 Summer Olympics
Pan American Games silver medalists for the United States
Pan American Games medalists in athletics (track and field)
People from Bellaire, Ohio
Players of American football from Ohio
Track and field athletes from Ohio
Ohio Bobcats football players
Medalists at the 1959 Pan American Games